Oil City is a town in Caddo Parish, Louisiana. The population was 1,008 at the time of the 2010 census. Oil City is located on Louisiana Highway 1, north of Caddo Lake. It is part of the Shreveport–Bossier City Metropolitan Statistical Area.

History
The park in Oil City is named for Earl Williamson. The local politician served for 40 years on the Caddo Parish police jury (1933 to 1972) and again from 1979 to 1980. He served as mayor of Vivian from 1938 to 1946, and again from 1962 to 1966.

John Charles "Chip" Dickey, Jr., the mayor from 2005 until his death in office in 2016 at the age of sixty, pushed for economic ventures, including the community center and restaurants. He was an ordained minister and led various youth camps. Dickey's father, John Charles Dickey, Sr., was the Oil City mayor from 1968 to 1976.

Geography
Oil City is located in northwestern Caddo Parish at  (32.742170, -93.974376).

Demographics

As of the 2020 United States census, there were 901 people, 406 households, and 220 families residing in the town. As of the census of 2000, there were 1,219 people, 480 households, and 311 families residing in the town.

In 2000, the racial makeup of the town was 55.13% White, 44.05% African American, 0.08% Native American, and 0.74% from two or more races. Hispanic or Latinos of any race were 1.72% of the population. By 2020, the racial and ethnic makeup was 49.94% non-Hispanic white, 41.4% Black or African American, 0.67% Native American, 0.22% Asian, 0.11% Pacific Islander, 5.88% multiracial, and 1.78% Hispanic or Latino of any race.

There were 480 households, out of which 34.2% had children under the age of 18 living with them, 38.5% were married couples living together, 21.3% had a female householder with no husband present, and 35.2% were non-families. 33.3% of all households were made up of individuals, and 16.3% had someone living alone who was 65 years of age or older. The average household size was 2.54 and the average family size was 3.27.

In the town, the population was spread out, with 32.2% under the age of 18, 10.4% from 18 to 24, 26.4% from 25 to 44, 18.1% from 45 to 64, and 12.9% who were 65 years of age or older. The median age was 30 years. For every 100 females, there were 83.9 males. For every 100 females age 18 and over, there were 80.2 males.

In 2000, the median income for a household in the town was $19,375, and the median income for a family was $25,114. Males had a median income of $23,516 versus $15,667 for females. The per capita income for the town was $9,697. About 28.8% of families and 35.9% of the population were below the poverty line, including 48.1% of those under age 18 and 28.4% of those age 65 or over. The 2020 American Community Survey estimated the median household income was $20,375, making it one of the poorest rural communities in Louisiana.

Notable people
 Earl Holliman, Golden Globe-winning film and TV actor, lived in Oil City during his teenage years and graduated from Oil City High School in 1946
Roy McArthur "Hoppy" Hopkins (1943–2006) member of the Louisiana House of Representatives from 1988 until his death

References

External links
Town of Oil City official website

Towns in Louisiana
Towns in Caddo Parish, Louisiana
Towns in Shreveport – Bossier City metropolitan area